Pterostylis williamsonii, commonly known as the brown-lip leafy greenhood, is a plant in the orchid family Orchidaceae and is endemic to Tasmania. Flowering plants have up to seven transparent green flowers with darker green and brown bands and a hairy, insect-like labellum with a blackish stripe. Non-flowering plants have a rosette of leaves on a short stalk but flowering plants lack the rosette, instead having five to seven stem leaves.

Description
Pterostylis williamsonii, is a terrestrial,  perennial, deciduous, herb with an underground tuber. The dorsal sepal and petals are fused, forming a hood or "galea" over the column with the dorsal sepal having a brown tip. Flowering occurs from April to July.

Taxonomy and naming
Pterostylis williamsonii was first formally described in 1998 by David Jones and the description was published in Australian Orchid Research from a specimen collected by Ron and Kath Williamson at Coles Bay. The specific epithet (williamsonii) honours 
Ronald Herbert Williamson (1931-2003), who collected the type specimen.

Distribution and habitat
The brown-lip leafy greenhood is widespread in Tasmania where it grows in forest near low shrubs and bracken.

References

williamsonii
Endemic orchids of Australia
Orchids of Tasmania
Plants described in 1998